Shun Ishikawa (石川駿, born May 26, 1990 in Kusatsu, Shiga, Japan) is a Japanese former professional baseball infielder. He has played in Nippon Professional Baseball (NPB) for the Chunichi Dragons.

Career
Chunichi Dragons selected Ishikawa with the forth selection in the 2014 NPB draft.

Along with teammates Takuya Kinoshita and Shota Tomonaga, he was selected for the Western League representative team for the 2016 Fresh All-Stars game in Okayama. Ishikawa started the game at first base, batting 6th and managed one hit in his 3 at-bats.

On November 3, 2020, Ishikawa announced his retirement.

References

External links

NPB.jp

1990 births
Living people
People from Shiga Prefecture
Japanese baseball players
Nippon Professional Baseball infielders
Chunichi Dragons players
Asian Games medalists in baseball
Baseball players at the 2014 Asian Games
Medalists at the 2014 Asian Games
Asian Games bronze medalists for Japan